Donald De Line (or Donald DeLine) is an American film producer. He was formerly the head of production at Paramount Pictures. He began his career as a studio executive at Walt Disney Productions and its Touchstone Pictures division in 1985, eventually serving as Disney's vice-president of production. He is a native of La Jolla, a community of San Diego, California. His well-known films have included Pretty Woman (1990), The Italian Job (2003), and Body of Lies (2008).

Career
 1985 — Began career at Disney as director of production
 1990 — Appointed senior vice president, production, for Touchstone Pictures 
 1991 — Promoted to executive vice president of Touchstone
 1998 — Established DeLine Pictures

Filmography
He was a producer in all films unless otherwise noted.

Film

Studio executive

Thanks

Television

References

External links

 

Living people
American film producers
Year of birth missing (living people)